Scopula paetula is a moth of the  family Geometridae. It is found in Peru.

References

Moths described in 1919
paetula
Moths of South America